Kendra Johnson is an American politician. She is a Democratic member of the Delaware House of Representatives, representing District 5. In 2018, Johnson was elected after winning a three-way primary race against Ajawavi J. Ajavon and William Resto Jr., where she received nearly 60 percent of the votes. She was unopposed in the general election.

References

External links
Official page at the Delaware General Assembly
Campaign site
 

Living people
Year of birth missing (living people)
People from New Castle, Delaware
Democratic Party members of the Delaware House of Representatives
Women state legislators in Delaware
African-American state legislators in Delaware
21st-century American women politicians
21st-century American politicians
21st-century African-American women
21st-century African-American politicians